John Conrad Migneault (February 4, 1949 – January 5, 2020) was a Canadian professional ice hockey player who played 258 games in the World Hockey Association.  He played for the Philadelphia Blazers, Vancouver Blazers, and Phoenix Roadrunners. He was born in Gull Lake, Saskatchewan, and died in Kimberley, British Columbia of cancer.

References

External links

1949 births
Canadian ice hockey right wingers
2020 deaths
Philadelphia Blazers players
Phoenix Roadrunners (WHA) players
Roanoke Valley Rebels (EHL) players
Vancouver Blazers players
Canadian expatriate ice hockey players in the United States